Torrevieja Club de Fútbol is a Spanish football team based in Torrevieja, in the Valencian Community. Founded in 1971, it is the youth football of SC Torrevieja CF, holding home matches at Estadio Vicente García.

History
In Torrevieja, football started to become popular during the time of the World War I. The first official ground was inaugurated in 1920, near the town's bus station, with a statue of a footballer being erected in the small plaza behind it in later years.

The first reference to Torrevieja CF is in 1923 and, although there was no official league for the team to play in, friendlies and summer cup competitions were arranged against other teams in the Vega Baja del Segura region. During the Spanish Civil War football came to a standstill, and it was not until the mid-1950s that Torrevieja again had an official team, with both Español Frente de Juventudes (known as el Hueso) and Club Deportivo Torrevejense (known as el Remiendo) being formed, with the peculiarity that no admission was charged, with fans making whatever contribution they could.

Over the next 15 years both of the clubs folded, leaving a void which was filled in 1971 with the foundation of Torrevieja Club de Fútbol. The town's mayor, Vicente García García, and his administration, took on the task to build the football ground, which was named after the politician, being inaugurated with a match with neighbouring Hércules CF.

In 1978, Torrevieja reached the fourth division – the first national category – for the first time ever, competing in that level for ten years after which it promoted again, now to the third level, a spell that ended in the 1992–93 campaign, with the club suffering another relegation in 1994 due to financial irregularities.

A new football club was set up in the town in 1993, Club Deportivo Torrevieja, which started playing in the second regional league. By 1996, the new side promoted to the competition's top level, as the original club dropped to the second, and was also renamed Fútbol Club Torrevieja, promoting to division four in 1997, but being relegated two seasons after.

Torrevieja CF played in the regional leagues until 2021, when the first team ceased activities and the club's youth setup became a part of Sporting Costa Blanca Torrevieja Club de Fútbol, a club founded in the previous year.

Season to season

5 seasons in Segunda División B
10 seasons in Tercera División

References

External links
Fútbol Regional team profile 

Football clubs in the Valencian Community
Association football clubs established in 1971
1971 establishments in Spain